The Office of China Coordination (OCC), informally known as China House, is a unit of the U.S. State Department that coordinates information and policy on China.

History
The OCC replaced the China Desk of Bureau of East Asian and Pacific Affairs in December 2022. The office has between 60 and 70 employees, including people detailed from other departments on topics such as international security, economics, technology, multilateral diplomacy, and strategic communication. The reorganization, launched by Secretary of State Antony Blinken, was described as a centerpiece of the Biden administration's diplomatic efforts in a global rivalry between the United States and China. 

Officials told Politico that the OCC would eliminate some silos among redundant government bodies and streamline policymaking. Politico described it as analogous to the Central Intelligence Agency's China Mission Center, in that both entities would be hubs for directing funding, resources and personnel. Before the reorganization, some former State Department officials had voiced concerns about adding another layer of bureaucracy, and a spokesperson for Republican Sen. Jim Risch of Idaho called the OCC a "bureaucratic power grab". Risch held up the reorganization for some months until his concerns were allayed.

References

2022 establishments in the United States
Government agencies established in 2022
China Coordination
China–United States relations